Aodh is an Irish and Scottish Gaelic male given name, originally meaning "fire".  Feminine forms of the name include Aodhnait and Aodhamair. It appears in even more variants as a surname. As a surname, the root or a variant may be prefixed by O, Ó, or Ui (meaning "from" or "descendant of"), Mac or Mc (meaning "son of"), or Nic (meaning "daughter of").

The name was originally related to an Irish god of the underworld. The masculine given name Hugh is a common anglicization, although the names are not etymologically linked (see Hughes (surname), Hughes (given name)).

Pet forms of the name formed with the diminutive -án include Aodhán and Ádhán (Old Irish Aedán), names which are sometimes anglicized as Aidan, Aiden, and Edan. A double diminutive is Aodhagán and its modern form Aogán. Maodhóg (Old Irish Máedóc), anglicized Mogue, and the Welsh form Madog are formed from the affectionate prefix mo- and the separate diminutive -og.

It was also used in Roman Britain as a native form of the Latin Dominus.

People with the name

Áed
Áed Rúad, legendary High king of Ireland
Áed mac Echach (died 575), king of Connacht
Áed mac Bricc (died 587), bishop and saint
Áed Dub mac Suibni (died 588), king of Dál nAraidi
Áed Dibchine (died c.595), king of Leinster
Áed mac Ainmuirech (died c.598), High king of Ireland
Áed Sláine (died 604), High king of Ireland
Áed Rón mac Cathail (died 604), king in Leinster
Áed Uaridnach (died 612), High king of Ireland
Áed Bennán mac Crimthainn (died 618), king of or in Munster
Áed Dub mac Colmáin (died 641?), bishop of Kildare
Áed Aired (died 698), king of Dál nAraide
Áed Róin (died 735), king of Dál Fiatach
Áed mac Colggen (died 738), king of Leinster
Áed Balb mac Indrechtaig (died 742), king of Connacht
Áed Muinderg (died 747), king of northern Uí Néill
Áed Find (died 778), king of Dál Riata
Áed Oirdnide (died 819), king of Ailech
Áed mac Boanta (died 839), probably king in Dál Riata
Áed of Scotland (died 878), king of the Picts
Áed Findliath (died 879), king of Ailech
Áed Ua Crimthainn (fl. mid-12th century), abbot of Terryglass

Aedh
Aedh mac Cathal Crobdearg Ua Conchobair, king of Connacht, 1223–1228
Aedh Muimhnech mac Felim Ua Conchobair, king of Connacht
Aedh mac Ruaidri Ua Conchobair, king of Connacht, 1228–1233
Aedh mac Aedh Breifneach Ua Conchobair
Áed Ua hOissín, First Archbishop of Tuam 1152

Aodh
Aodh, Earl of Ross (died 1333)
Aodh Mór Ó Néill (1540–1616), Irish earl and resistance leader
Aodh Mac Cathmhaoil (1571–1626), Irish archbishop and theologian
Aodh Rua Ó Domhnaill (1572–1601), Irish King, Lord and rebel leader
Aodh Mac Dónaill (Hugh McDonnell), Irish scribe

Aodhagan, Aodhagán, Aodhán, Aogán
The spelling Aogán reflects the loss of the light dha syllable, pronounced , but the o may be reinterpreted as  even in that spellinɡ.
Aodhagan O'Neill (1959-), Irish darts player
 Aogán Ó Rathaille (1670–1728), Irish language poet
 Aodhán Ó Ríordáin (1976-), Irish politician

See also
Aidan (name) 
Hayes (given name)
List of Irish-language given names

References

Irish-language masculine given names